Lindquist is a surname of Swedish origin which may refer to:

People
 Alan Lindquest (1891–1984), Swedish-American voice teacher
 Anders Lindquist (born 1942), Swedish applied mathematician and control theorist
 Barbara Lindquist (born 1969), American triathlete
 Bosse Lindquist (born 1954), Swedish radio and TV producer and writer
 Carl Lindquist (disambiguation)
 Ed Lindquist (born 1938), former American politician in the Oregon House of Representatives
 Emory Lindquist (1908–1992), professor and author of books on Swedish-American history
 Evan Lindquist (born 1936), artist and printmaker, artist laureate for Arkansas 2013–2017
 Everett Franklin Lindquist (1901–1978), American professor of education at the University of Iowa
 Francis O. Lindquist (1869–1924), American politician from Michigan
 Greg Lindquist (born 1979), American artist
 H. L. Lindquist (1884–1978), early 20th century editor and publisher of philatelic books
 Jack Lindquist (1927–2016), American child actor, president of the Disneyland amusement park in Anaheim, California
 Johan Lindquist (died 1779), Swedish clock and watch maker
 Leonard E. Lindquist (1912-2004), American lawyer and politician from Minnesota
 Marita Lindquist (born 1918), Finnish author of children's books and lyricist
 Mark Lindquist (born 1949), American wood-sculptor
 Marty Lindquist (born 1969), American cruiserweight professional boxer from Minnesota
 Mel Lindquist (1911–2000), American sculptor
 Paul Lindquist (born 1964), Swedish politician and municipal commissioner of Lidingö
 Roy E. Lindquist (1907–1986), Commander in the United States Army
 Sture Lindquist (1910–1978), Swedish chess master
 Susan Lindquist (1949–2016), American scientist
 Tim Lindquist, American founder of video game publications
 Vic Lindquist (1908–1983), Canadian ice hockey player

Places
 Lindquist Apartment House, an apartment complex located in northeast Portland, Oregon, United States, listed on the National Register of Historic Places
 Lindquist Field, a stadium in Ogden, Utah, United States
 Lindquist Island, part of the North Barnard Islands, Australia
 Lindquist Lake, a freshwater lake in northeastern Wisconsin, United States

Other
 Lindquist & Vennum, a Minneapolis law firm

See also
 Lindqvist

Swedish-language surnames